The real was the currency of Santo Domingo (now the Dominican Republic) until 1822. Some coins were struck locally which circulated alongside other Spanish colonial coins. The real was replaced by the Haitian gourde when Santo Domingo was taken over by Haïti.

For later currencies of the Dominican Republic, see Dominican peso

Coins
Mexican 1 and 8 real coins were countermarked with the crowned monogram F7o for circulation in Santo Domingo.

References

External links

Modern obsolete currencies
1822 disestablishments in North America
Currencies of the Dominican Republic